
Kolya is a Czech film.

Kolya may also refer to:

Places
 Kolya, Iran, a village
 Kolya (crater), on the Moon
 6619 Kolya, an asteroid

People
 Kolya Vasin (1945–2018), Russian music historian and writer, one of the main popularizers of the Beatles inside the USSR and Russia

Fictional characters
 Kolya Krassotkin, in Dostoevsky's novel The Brothers Karamazov
 Kólya, in Dostoevsky's novel The Idiot
  Nikolai "Kolya" Rodchenko, a protagonist of the 1985 American film White Nights, played by Mikhail Baryshnikov
 the title character of the 1996 Czech film Kolya
 the protagonist of the 2014 Russian film Leviathan 
 Acastus Kolya, a character in the American television series Stargate Atlantis

See also
 Kolja (disambiguation)
 Nikolai (disambiguation)

Russian masculine given names
Hypocorisms